Lax'n'Busto are a pop-rock group formed in 1986 in El Vendrell, Catalonia, Spain.

Discography
 1989: "Vas de punt ...o què!!!"
 1991: "Lax´N´Busto"
 1992: "Vas de punt ...o què!!!" without banned song "Carme Flavià".
 1993: "Qui ets tu?"
 1995: "La caixa que puja i baixa"
 1996: "A l'Auditori".
 1998: "Sí".
 2000: "Lllença’t".
 2002: Elèctric Tour.
 2003: "Morfina".
 2004: "Amb tu Tour".
 2005: "Amb tu"
 2006: Last Pemi Fortuny's concert.
 2006: Lax'n'Busto incorpore the new singer, Salva Racero.
 2007: "Relax"
 2008: "Objectiu: La lluna"
 2009: "A l'Apolo"
 2013: "Tot és més senzill"
 2019: "Polièdric"

Members
 Jimmy Piñol Mercader: drums and chorus
Born in Vendrell on 20 July 1971.
 Jesús Rovira Costas: bass and chorus.
Born in Vendrell on 24 May 1968.
 Pemi Rovirosa guitar and chorus.
Born in Vendrell on 5 June 1969.
 Cristian G. Montenegro: guitar.
Born in Vilafranca del Penedès, on 15 October 1970.
 Eduard Font: keyboards.
Born in Torroella de Montgrí on 11 November 1975.
Before this he had been with Sopa de Cabra and Glaucs.

Former members 
 Pemi Fortuny Soler: vocals and guitar.
Born in Vendrell on 16 September de 1965, he left Lax'n'Busto on 20 October 2006.
 Salva Racero Alberch: vocals.
Born in Manresa on 8 August 1976, he was the lead singer in the band from 2006 to 2016.

External links 
 Official Web site
 Lax'n'Busto song lyrics
 Ritmes.net page
 Ritmes.cat page
 Botiboti.org page
 Fan Club Web site

Musical groups from Catalonia
Spanish rock music groups
Spanish pop music groups
Música Global artists